Sayles Memorial Hall is a Richardsonian Romanesque hall on the central campus of Brown University in Providence, Rhode Island. The granite structure was designed by Alpheus C. Morse and constructed from 1879 to 1881.

History 
Sayles Hall was built in memoriam of William Clark Sayles, who entered Brown in 1874 and died in 1876. In 1878 Sayles' father gifted the school $50,000 for the construction of a building in his sons' honor “which shall be exclusively and forever devoted to lectures and recitations, and to meetings on academic occasions.”

Structure 
The building is constructed of rock-faced Westerly granite with Longmeadow brownstone trim. 

The structure follows a T-shaped plan. The front section measures 35 by 75 feet and is topped by a hipped roof; the rear of the building has a gabled roof. The main auditorium of the building is characterized by pine roof trusses.

Organ 
The building is home to a 1903 Hutchings-Votey organ gifted to the university by Lucian Sharpe. Today, the organ is the largest remaining Hutchings-Votey organ of its type. The organ is used for an annual Halloween concert which begins at midnight.

Portraits 
The main auditorium of the structure is adorned with 35 historical and contemporary portraits of leaders and benefactors of the university. In 1997, a portrait of Sarah Elizabeth Doyle was stolen from the building. In 2016, the university installed a portrait of President Emerita Ruth Simmons, making her the first and only Black woman represented in the collection.

Gallery

References 

Brown University buildings
Richardsonian Romanesque architecture in Rhode Island
Buildings and structures completed in 1881